Galbulimima belgraveana is a hallucinogenic plant. Its common names include agara and white magnolia. It is native to northeastern Australia, Malaysia, and Papua New Guinea. Papuans (who tend to use this drug the most) boil the bark and the leaves together with another plant, called Homalomena, in order to make tea. This tea leads to a deep sleep, in which it is said that vivid dreams and visions occur. The plant itself grows to about 90 feet, it has no petals and its flower are a yellow-brown colour.

Several psychoactive alkaloids structurally related to himbacine, a muscarinic receptor antagonist, have been isolated from the plant, but the primary psychoactive constituent responsible for the plant's hallucinogenic effects has not yet been identified.
The tree is also used for its wood.

References

External links
PNG TreesKey Species Profile

Magnoliales
Taxa named by Ferdinand von Mueller